The International Day for the Elimination of Racial Discrimination is observed annually on 21 March. On that day, in 1960, police opened fire at a peaceful demonstration in Sharpeville, South Africa, against the apartheid pass laws; 69 people were killed, and 180 were injured. Proclaiming the day in 1966, the United Nations General Assembly called on the international community to redouble its efforts to eliminate all forms of racial discrimination.

Human Rights Day in South Africa
In South Africa, Human Rights Day is a public holiday celebrated on 21 March each year. The day commemorates the lives of those who died to fight for democracy and equal human rights for all in South Africa during apartheid, an institutionally racist system built upon racial discrimination. The Sharpeville Massacre on 21 March 1960 is the particular reference day for this public holiday.

Themes 
Every year, the International Day for the Elimination of Racial Discrimination is under one specific theme:
 2010: Disqualify Racism
 2014: The Role of Leaders in Combatting Racism and Racial Discrimination
 2015: Learning from tragedies to combat racial discrimination today
 2017: Racial profiling and incitement to hatred, including in the context of migration
 2018: Promoting tolerance, inclusion, unity and respect for diversity in the context of combating racial discrimination
 2019: Mitigating and countering rising nationalist populism and extreme supremacist ideologies
 2020: Recognition, justice and development: The midterm review of the International Decade for People of African Descent
 2022: Voices for action against racism

See also
 European Action Week Against Racism, around 21 March

References

External links

 International Day for the Elimination of Racial Discrimination, 21 March on the United Nations website
 International Day for the Elimination of Racial Discrimination on the UNESCO website

Civil awareness days
Elimination of Racism
International opposition to apartheid in South Africa
March observances